Óscar Pérez Rojas (born 1 February 1973) is a Mexican former professional footballer who played as a goalkeeper. Nicknamed "El Conejo" (Spanish for The Rabbit), he is regarded as one of the best goalkeepers in Mexican football history.

With a club career spanning 26 seasons in Mexico's top flight, most notably with Cruz Azul and Pachuca, Pérez won the CONCACAF Champions League on three occasions, as well as two league titles and one domestic cup. He holds the national record for most league appearances, with 740.

Pérez earned 55 caps for  the Mexico national team between 1997 and 2010, winning three CONCACAF Gold Cup titles and the 1999 FIFA Confederations Cup. He also featured in the 1998, 2002 and 2010 editions of the FIFA World Cup, in the two latter as first choice goalkeeper.

Club career 
He was the starting goalkeeper for Cruz Azul since 1997 with the team winning the championship in the 1997 Winter Season. Pérez debuted for the team in 1993, facing Atlas which ended in a 0–0 draw. He quickly became the starting goalkeeper for Cruz Azul and won the 1997 Invierno Final, where Cruz Azul defeated Club León by a score of 2–1.

In 2001, he helped steer Cruz Azul all the way to the final of the Copa Libertadores, a historic run for a Mexican club in the competition. With Pérez in goal, Cruz Azul was able to eliminate teams like Cerro Porteño, River Plate and Rosario Central, before playing Boca Juniors in the two-legged final. In the final, they lost at home, and won in Buenos Aires to take the final to a penalty-shootout but lost 1–3.

In a league game away to Estudiantes Tecos in 2006, Pérez scored by a header in stoppage time to equalise 1–1. In 2007, he was given an award for a record-making 400 appearances at Cruz Azul.

He moved to Tigres UANL, starting 4 games in the Apertura 2008. Pérez's first game with Tigres was on 13 July 2008 in a friendly against his former team, Cruz Azul which ended in a draw 1–1. He was a great addition to Tigres as he maintained the least goal approaches of the Apertura 2008 tournament.

After a year with Tigres, he moved to Chiapas on loan where he played in the 2009–10 season.

For the Apertura 2010, Pérez moved to Club Necaxa. After leaving Club Necaxa Pérez joined with San Luis on loan.

On 16 May 2013, For the Apertura 2013, Pérez was loaned to Pachuca after finishing a spell with San Luis. He was given the number 21.

On 29 May 2016, Pérez won the Liga MX final with Pachuca. This broke his personal 19-year drought as well, making him the oldest champion in the league's history at 43-years-old and three months. After the season, Pachuca extended his loan for another year.

On 29 April 2017, Pérez scored a header on the last minute of a match against Cruz Azul to salvage a 2–2 draw. He became the oldest player to score a goal in the Liga MX.

After winning the 2016–17 CONCACAF Champions League with Pachuca, Pérez postponed his retirement until after Pachuca's participation at the 2017 FIFA Club World Cup. Following the tournament, Pérez announced he planned on playing professionally for six more months, effectively postponing his retirement until after the 2017–18 Liga MX season.

On 23 July 2019, Pérez returned to his first club, Cruz Azul. On 27 July, at the age of 46, he announced his retirement from football effective immediately after Cruz Azul's second round match of the Torneo Apertura 2019 against Toluca.

International career 
Pérez scored his first and only international goal for the under-23 team in a friendly against South Korea under-23, scoring in injury time when Mexico were losing 1–0.

Pérez was considered to be one of the best goalkeepers in Mexico and took over the spot for starting goalie during the 2002 World Cup Qualifiers, going on to play in the 2002 World Cup as the first-choice goalkeeper. Once Javier Aguirre left the national team, Ricardo La Volpe became coach, and Oswaldo Sánchez took over his spot.

Guillermo Ochoa was expected to be the starting keeper for Mexico at the 2010 World Cup but in a surprise move, Pérez was called up and played as the starting goalkeeper in the tournament. Following Mexico's loss in the Round of 16 to Argentina, Pérez announced his retirement from the national team on 14 July 2010.

Career statistics

International

Honours
Cruz Azul
Primera División: Invierno 1997
Copa México: 1996–97
CONCACAF Champions' Cup: 1996, 1997

Pachuca
Liga MX: Clausura 2016
CONCACAF Champions League: 2016–17

Mexico
FIFA Confederations Cup: 1999
CONCACAF Gold Cup: 1998, 2003, 2009

Individual
Liga MX Best XI: Clausura 2016

References

External links

 

1973 births
Living people
Footballers from Mexico City
Association football goalkeepers
Mexico international footballers
1995 Copa América players
1997 FIFA Confederations Cup players
1998 CONCACAF Gold Cup players
1998 FIFA World Cup players
1999 Copa América players
1999 FIFA Confederations Cup players
2000 CONCACAF Gold Cup players
2001 Copa América players
2002 FIFA World Cup players
2003 CONCACAF Gold Cup players
2004 Copa América players
2009 CONCACAF Gold Cup players
2010 FIFA World Cup players
CONCACAF Gold Cup-winning players
FIFA Confederations Cup-winning players
Liga MX players
Cruz Azul footballers
Tigres UANL footballers
Chiapas F.C. footballers
Club Necaxa footballers
San Luis F.C. players
C.F. Pachuca players
Mexican footballers
Cruz Azul non-playing staff
Pan American Games medalists in football
Pan American Games silver medalists for Mexico
Medalists at the 1995 Pan American Games
Footballers at the 1995 Pan American Games
Association football goalkeeping coaches